Jin Sun-Yu (Hangul: 진선유, Hanja: 陳善有, born December 17, 1988 in Daegu, South Korea) is a South Korean short-track speed skater. She is a triple Olympic Champion from 2006 and a three-time Overall World Champion (for 2005–2007).

She was the winner of the gold medal in the 1500 meters and the silver medal in the 1000 meters at the 2005 World Championships, as she ended up as the overall champion. At the 2006 World Championships, Jin won the 1000, 1500, and 3000 meters on her way to a second consecutive overall championship.  She also finished first in the overall World Cup standings for the 2005–2006 season.

At the 2006 Winter Olympics, she won three gold medals, winning women's individual 1000 meters, and 1500 meters events, and as a member of the South Korean women's victorious 3000 meter relay team. In doing so, Jin became the first athlete (by less than half an hour) from Korea to win three gold medals in one Olympics. Ahn Hyun-Soo matched Jin's achievement later by helping Korea to win men's 5000 meters relay.

See also
 South Korea at the 2006 Winter Olympics

External links
 NBC Olympics profile 

1988 births
Living people
South Korean female short track speed skaters
Olympic short track speed skaters of South Korea
Olympic gold medalists for South Korea
Olympic medalists in short track speed skating
Short track speed skaters at the 2006 Winter Olympics
Medalists at the 2006 Winter Olympics
Asian Games medalists in short track speed skating
Short track speed skaters at the 2007 Asian Winter Games
Sportspeople from Daegu
Dankook University alumni
South Korean female speed skaters
Medalists at the 2007 Asian Winter Games
Asian Games gold medalists for South Korea
Asian Games silver medalists for South Korea
21st-century South Korean women